This was the third season of the Malaya Cup (later known as the Malaysia Cup), an annual soccer tournament. It was contested by states in Malaya. The final was contested by the southern and northern champions in their respective conference rounds. Seven states sent their teams. The final was held at Selangor Club Field on 25 August 1923 where Singapore collected their second title in three consecutive final appearances against Perak with scoreline 2–1. It was during this year that a newspaper described it as "by far the greatest sporting event of the year (in Malaya)".

Conference Round
Seven teams participated in the third edition of the Malaya Cup, Johor, Malacca, Negeri Sembilan, Singapore, Penang, Selangor and Perak. The teams were divided into two conferences, the Northern Section and Southern Section. The Northern Section comprised Penang, Selangor and Perak, while the Southern Section was composed of Johor, Negeri Sembilan, Malacca and Singapore. Each team played against each other (two games per team) and the winners of each conference played in the final. Each win gave the winning team 2 points while losing gave 0 points. A draw meant a point shared between two teams.

Northern Section

Southern Section

Final
The final was held at Selangor Club Field on 25 August 1923. Singapore won the match 2–1 against Perak. This was Singapore's second title in three consecutive final appearances.

Winners

References

External links
1923 Malaya Cup Results by Rec.Sport.Soccer Statistics Foundation(RSSSF)

1923 in Malayan football
Malaysia Cup seasons